Holly Hall may refer to:
Holly Hall, Dudley, a residential area of Dudley, West Midlands, England
Holly Hall Academy
Holly Hall (Elkton, Maryland), a historic home in Elkton, Maryland, United States